Rugby union in Poland is a minor, but growing sport and currently, the Polish men`s national team are ranked 30th in the world as of 20th November 2022.

Governing body

Polish Rugby Union (Polski Związek Rugby) was founded in 1957, and joined the International Rugby Football Board in 1988. The official supplier of equipment to the PRU is the Polish company Gonga.

An earlier Polish Rugby Union was set up in the early 1920s, but was disbanded in 1928.

History
In 1921, Louis Amblard, a Frenchman, set up the very first Polish rugby club called White Eagles (Białe Orły). The first match was in 1922, and the first club international in 1924 against a Romanian side.

The game became established in the Warsaw Military Academy in the early 1930s.

The tragic events of World War II and the Molotov–Ribbentrop Pact meant that the growth of Polish rugby was retarded until the 1950s. During World War II, there were occasional games between allied POWs in German camps in Poland. For example, a game was held between a Scottish and a Welsh XV, in ten inches of snow. No conversions were allowed, as the ball would have gone over the camp fence, and the game was twenty minutes each way. Players wore army boots, trousers, prison shirts and balaclavas.

Polish rugby arguably achieved its greatest success in the late 1970s when the national team beat Italy, Spain and the USSR, and also held Romania to a 37–21 win in 1977.

"Much to everyone's surprise, Eastern Bloc countries are among the game's vigorous participants, seemingly oblivious to rugby's capitalist class-ridden origins. Russia emerged from behind the Iron Curtain and came under international scrutiny when they played France in Toulouse in November 1978. Romania, Poland and Czechoslovakia are members of the Federation Internationale de Rugby Amateur, the governing body for those countries not in the IB."

In 1983, Poland failed to play  in the FIRA Championships, and told FIRA that two of their players had died. It is not known where the other died, but one had died near Bucharest.

The Cold War frequently intruded – for example in the 1984 FIRA Championships, in the game against France, Poland demanded the removal of the French players Didier Camberabero, Henri Sanz and the Brive RFC centre Yves Fouget, because as members of the French armed forces, they were considered to be a security risk.

Because of high Polish emigration, particularly to France, and English speaking nations, the Polish team actually has a fairly large pool of potential players. In addition, a number of Poles returning from jobs in the British Isles and France, have carried the game back with them.

There are currently three divisions in Poland. The second division was relaunched in 2009 using some of the major teams providing 2nd XVs, along with some newly formed sides. The top division has 8 teams while the second division has 6 teams. Prior to that in 2008/2009 there were 10 teams in the top division and only 4 in the second. This led to some very uneven contests between the top teams and those at the bottom of the league. There is now also a regional league played in the centre of Poland (around Lodz and Warsaw) in which some smaller clubs have entered teams and second teams from some of the top clubs nationally compete.

Polish rugby development, however, has tended to concentrate on rugby sevens as a means of introducing the sport to people. The PRU organises regular one day sevens tournaments over the spring/summer with teams travelling from all over the country. There are teams forming all over the country, but there is a shortage of quality coaching and basic equipment. Despite this rugby is making good headway.

Rugby tens also has some popularity in Poland.

National team

Poland's international debut was in 1958 against , and they won the match, 9–8.

They compete in the second division competition Rugby Europe Trophy, where the winner is promoted to the Premier Division Rugby Europe Championship. In 2018, Poland competed against Portugal, Netherlands, Czech Republic, Switzerland, and Maldova.

In 2018, the Polish XV Men's team was ranked 35 in the world. They also compete in the VII's Europe Grand Prix 7s Series.

Women's Polish Rugby compete in the Women's 7s GPS, where they play other European countries, such as Ireland, Wales, Scotland, Italy, France, Russia and Germany

Notable players
In the 1990s, there were at least fifty Poles playing in the French first and second divisions. Notable amongst these was Grzegorz Kacala, the  open side flanker, who helped Brive win the 1996 European Cup.

Mariusz Pudzianowski, better known as a Polish strongman, is one of the most famous Polish rugby players. He played with Budowlani Lodz but retired after one season.

Men's rugby

XV Rugby

Ekstraliga
Rugby Ekstraliga
Teams 
Budowlani SA Łódź
Lechia Gdańsk
Orkan Sochaczew
KS Budowlani Łódź
Arka Gdynia
Pogoń Siedlce 
Ogniwo Sopot
Budowlani Lublin
Skra Warszawa
Juvenia Kraków

Liga I
Teams
Sparta Jarocin
Wataha Zielona Góra
Arka Rumia
AZS AWF Warszawa
Rugby Ruda Śląska
Legia Warszawa

Liga II
II liga Rugby Teams
Chaos Poznan
Mazovia Minsk Mazowiecki
Copper Lubin 
Alfa Bydgoszcz
Rugby Bialystok
Unia Brześć / Terespol

Seven's Rugby
Teams.

Posnania Poznań   
Lechia Gdańsk  
GTR Tytan Gniezno
Juvenia Kraków   
RC Orkan Sochaczew   

AZS AWFiS Gdańsk 
Rugby Bełchatów 
Werewolves Wąbrzeźno
Rugby Team Olsztyn  

Kaskada Szczecin
Szarża Grudziądz  
Budowlani Łódź SA 
KS Budowlani Łódź

Women's rugby
Although Poland's women have not yet played test match rugby, they have been playing international sevens rugby since 2005. (Current playing record).

Seven's Rugby
Teams.

Biało-Zielone Ladies Gdańsk
Black Roses Posnania Poznań
Legia Warszawa
Juvenia Kraków

AZS AWF Warszawa
Legia II Warszawa
Miedziowe Lubin

KS Rugby Gierzwałd
Flota Gdynia
Diablice Ruda Śląska
Tygrysice Orkan Sochaczew

Youth and children's rugby
Poland rugby has a youth tournament for different age groups.

XV and Seven's Rugby
Teams

UKS Piątka Wilda Poznań
KS BBRC Łódź
UKS Karb przy MDK 2 Bytom
UKS Cisowa Arka Gdynia
UKS Dziesiątka Gdynia
UKS Gorce Raba Niżna
SP Grodysławice

Hegemon Akademia Rugby
UKS Kadet Rachanie
UKS Koziołki Jerzykowo-Biskupice
UKS Rugby Lubień
KS Marlin Ozorków
Miejski Klub Rugby Siedlce
KR Owal Leszno

UKS Osiemdziesiątka Sochaczew
UKS Rugby Czeczewo
Rugby Gorzów Wielkopolski
UKS Strzałka
SP Wożuczyn
UKS Żaczek Michalów

Skill standard

The standard of domestic rugby is relatively low in Poland. Most national players play in lower division teams in France (even in second/third teams) while some national players play in the domestic league. The main teams are based in the three main conurbations of Tricity, in Warsaw and Łódź (the latter, being current national champions). In Poland, because rugby union is viewed as a "power sport", flamboyance is not encouraged.

See also

 Poland national rugby union team
 Poland national rugby sevens team
 Poland women's national rugby sevens team
 Ekstraliga
 I liga Rugby
 II liga Rugby

External links
 IRB Poland page
 Official union page
 Poland rugby news
 Archives du Rugby: Pologne
 Poland Tapping into French Rugby Roots

References
 Cotton, Fran (Ed.) (1984) The Book of Rugby Disasters & Bizarre Records. Compiled by Chris Rhys. London. Century Publishing. 
 Richards, Huw A Game for Hooligans: The History of Rugby Union (Mainstream Publishing, Edinburgh, 2007)

 

Rugby union in Poland